The men's Greco-Roman welterweight competition at the 1960 Summer Olympics in Rome took place from 26 to 31 August at the Basilica of Maxentius. Nations were limited to one competitor.

Competition format
This Greco-Roman wrestling competition continued to use the "bad points" elimination system introduced at the 1928 Summer Olympics for Greco-Roman and at the 1932 Summer Olympics for freestyle wrestling, though adjusted the point values slightly. Wins by fall continued to be worth 0 points and wins by decision continued to be worth 1 point. Losses by fall, however, were now worth 4 points (up from 3). Losses by decision were worth 3 points (consistent with most prior years, though in some losses by split decision had been worth only 2 points). Ties were now allowed, worth 2 points for each wrestler. The elimination threshold was also increased from 5 points to 6 points. The medal round concept, used in 1952 and 1956 requiring a round-robin amongst the medalists even if one or more finished a round with enough points for elimination, was used only if exactly three wrestlers remained after a round—if two competitors remained, they faced off head-to-head; if only one, he was the gold medalist.

Results

Round 1

Rosbag was injured during his bout and was unable to continue.

 Bouts

 Points

Round 2

 Bouts

 Points

Round 3

 Bouts

 Points

Round 4

 Bouts

 Points

Round 5

 Bouts

 Points

Round 6

 Bouts

 Points

Round 7

All three remaining wrestlers had 5 points and none had faced either of the others. Rather than giving one of the wrestlers the substantial advantage of a bye in this round, the three men faced each other in a round-robin.

 Bouts

 Points

References

Wrestling at the 1960 Summer Olympics